Willem van Hasselt (3 September 1882 – 23 August 1963) was a Dutch painter. His work was part of the painting event in the art competition at the 1924 Summer Olympics.

References

1882 births
1963 deaths
19th-century Dutch painters
20th-century Dutch painters
Dutch male painters
Olympic competitors in art competitions
Painters from Rotterdam
19th-century Dutch male artists
20th-century Dutch male artists